An  Ilú or Ilu is the Yoruba name for a type of Brazilian wooden folk drum,  found characteristically in the northern provinces of  Pernambuco and Ceará.

It has a cylindrical shape with skins at the top and bottom of it, normally being played with hands. It is mostly used in religious rituals, coming usually in three sizes, curved or flat-shaped. This make these drums sound slightly different from each other, and to allow performers to play on a standing position. They are built on a cross-shaped base.

The same term was earlier used for double-headed barrel-shaped drums, a similar drum from  southern Brazil is known as a Tambu.

References 

Drums
Brazilian musical instruments